Jamal Rashaad French (born June 18, 1986), known professionally as J French, is an American rapper, singer, and songwriter from Oklahoma. He released his first single, I Feel Like I'm On Dope, in September 2014. He is best known for his album JAGG (Just Another Gift From God) released in 2020.

Career
Jamal French was born in Oklahoma City. He released his first album "Jaguar Jesus" in 2016. That same year he released singles "Medicine Ball" and "Dallas". In June 2018, J French received national attention for his single "God Given". "God Given" was also on J French's 2nd studio album "OGB" released earlier that year. In November 2018, J French gained local attention for his 3rd studio album "OGB 1.5". In 2019 gained local attention fore the release of the short film ONE POINT 5IVE. Later in 2019, J French released the single "Cut You Off" featuring notable Dallas rap artist Yella Beezy. J French's latest album "JAGG (Just Another Gift From God)" was released in August 2020.

Discography

Albums and EPs

Singles

References

External links
J French Official Instagram

1988 births
Living people
Musicians from Oklahoma City